Angels of the Universe (Icelandic: Englar alheimsins) is a 2000 Icelandic film directed and produced by Friðrik Þór Friðriksson. The leading role is played by Ingvar E. Sigurðsson, who was nominated for the European Film Awards for best acting. The story is based on Einar Már Guðmundsson's 1995 novel of the same name, a semi-fictional story about Einar's brother Pálmi Örn Guðmundsson (named Páll in the book and movie). Much of the book is true; for example, Pálmi was mentally ill and painted as a hobby.

Plot 
Englar Alheimsins, often called the Icelandic One Flew Over the Cuckoo's Nest, is the story of an Icelandic man, Páll (Ingvar E. Sigurðsson), who slowly descends into madness and depression after his girlfriend leaves him. His parents decide to send him to a mental hospital, where he meets Óli (Baltasar Kormákur), who believes he's the songwriter for The Beatles, Viktor (Björn Jörundur Friðbjörnsson), who signs cheques with the signature of Adolf Hitler, and other special characters. The movie depicts his struggle, both in and out of the mental hospital.

Soundtrack 
The movie soundtrack features the compositions of Hilmar Örn Hilmarsson, as well as two songs of the popular band Sigur Rós: "Bíum Bíum Bambaló" and "Dánarfregnir Og Jarðarfarir". The film also includes several American rock songs, though they are not present on the soundtrack CD release.

Awards and nominations
The film won the following awards:
Edda Awards (February 2000)
 Best Film
 Actor of the Year (Ingvar Eggert Sigurðsson)
 Supporting Actor of the Year (Björn Jörundur Friðbjörnsson)
 Supporting Actress of the Year (Margrét Helga Jóhannsdóttir)
 Director of the Year (Friðrik Þór Friðriksson)
 Professional Category: Music (Sigur Rós & Hilmar Örn Hilmarsson)
 Professional Category: Sound (Kjartan Kjartansson)
 Karlovy Vary International Film Festival (July 2000)
 Special Jury Mention (Friðrik Þór Friðriksson)
 Nominated for the Crystal Globe
 Sea International Film Festival (September 2000)
 Film and Literature Award (Friðrik Þór Friðriksson)
 European Film Awards (December 2000)
 Audience Award for Best European Actor (Ingvar Eggert Sigurðsson)
 Nominated for the European Film Award
 Santa Barbara International Film Festival (March 2001)
 World Prism Award (Friðrik Þór Friðriksson) 
 Festróia - Tróia International Film Festival (June 2001)
 Silver Dolphin for Best Actor (Ingvar Eggert Sigurðsson)
 OCIC Award - Special Mention (Friðrik Þór Friðriksson)
 Nominated for the Golden Dolphin

References

External links 
 
 

2000 films
2000s Icelandic-language films
Films set in psychiatric hospitals
2000 drama films
Films directed by Friðrik Þór Friðriksson
Films scored by Hilmar Örn Hilmarsson
Icelandic drama films
Films based on Icelandic novels